Hercules in the Maze of the Minotaur is the fifth and final television movie in the syndicated fantasy series Hercules: The Legendary Journeys.

In the film, Hercules has given up his days of traveling and has settled down to spend some time with his family. When a distant village is threatened by an unseen monster, Hercules is called upon to help save the village from the monster.

Plot
In a sun-dappled forest, two men are searching for buried treasure. They pace out the step given with the map, and discover a cave overgrown with bushes. The two men break through the plants and enter the cave. In the cave they find a huge wooden door, as they try to get through the door, a monster breaks through the door and chases after them. One man is captured and the other flees as the monster tells him to bring Hercules. Meanwhile, Hercules works on his farms, he sees his sons fighting and tells them that they should not fight. They say that Hercules fights, Hercules explains that he only fights when he has to and only to prevent other people from being harmed. He tells about the time when he had to fight Eryx the boxer to stop him from killing anymore people. He asks the boys if they understand, and they say they do. Later that evening, Hercules is working in the stable, Zeus appears and they chat. Hercules tells Zeus that there have been no monsters for a while, which is good as he has now settled down with Deianeira  to raise the children. Zeus gives him a scale from a sea serpent and Hercules remembers the time when he and Deianeira were swallowed by a sea serpent while looking for the lost city of Troy. While day-dreaming he snaps back to reality at the dinner table to find the dog eating his dinner. Back in the cave, the Minotaur broods in wait for Hercules.

At night the children ask their father to tell them a story, Ilea asks for Hercules to tell her about when he and Deianeira first met. Hercules begins relating how the fire had vanished from the Earth and that Deianeira's village needed fire, and how he got the fire back from Hera's temple. Halfway through the story Hercules realises the children are asleep. He and Deianeira retire to bed and she asks him if he misses his adventures and battling monsters, he says truthfully that he does miss it. The following day, Hercules is working in the stables and sees something flit past the door, he goes to look but sees nothing. As he walks back into the stable a man jumps down upon him, Hercules turns to see it is Iolaus. They begin talking about their adventures and the time when they had to fight the Lernaean Hydra that Hera had sent to kill them. The two men go inside to get a drink, Iolaus tells Hercules that he met a man who taught him some new moves that allow smaller men to overpower a bigger man. Hercules says he will not fight Iolaus, but he is eventually persuaded. The two men strip off their tops and prepare to spar. When Hercules attacks Iolaus he is overpowered by the smaller man, but after a short while Hercules gets the best of Iolaus as he sees Deianeira and Ilea standing in the doorway. Deianeira tells Iolaus that since Hercules gave up his adventures he has become depressed. A man arrives at the stable looking for Hercules, he tells him that he must help his village and that a monster has taken his brother. Hercules says he cannot go and the man says he has to because he is Hercules. Later that evening Deianeria asks him why he refused to help and he tells her that he promised to stay and raise the children with her. She tells him that he should not try to stop being Hercules, not for her or the children. She tells him to go and the next day her and Iolaus set off for Alturia. As they travel to Alturia a young couple are looking for somewhere quiet, they find the cave and enter. While they are making out the Minotaur comes and attacks them.

When Hercules and Iolaus arrive in Alturia they ask a woman where the monster is and she tells Hercules that there is not any monster. Underneath the village the Minotaur swears that Hercules will pay, Zeus appears and tells the Minotaur that he still has not learned his lesson, he replies that he has been feeding on hate. Minotaur taunts Zeus because he was unable to kill the Minotaur. Hercules and Iolaus are in a tavern and end up fighting some men because they do not believe that he is really Hercules. Outside the tavern three men are killed and Hercules goes to investigate, only to be found by the villagers. They think he killed the men and chase him and Iolaus. The man who had asked for Hercules's help comes and takes Hercules to the cave where his brother was captured. Zeus appears and tells Hercules what the monster is and why he wants Hercules. He asks Hercules to kill the Minotaur, and he enters the cave. In the center of the cave he finds the Minotaur, who challenges Hercules. They begin fighting and as Hercules is about to kill the Minotaur, the creature reveals that he is really Hercules' brother Gryphus and Hercules cannot kill him. The Minotaur then attacks Hercules and Hercules ends up killing him by throwing him onto a stalagmite as Zeus arrives. As Gryphus lies dying, Hercules says he is sorry Zeus had to lose a son this way.  Zeus says to Hercules that Gryphus was lost the day he tried to lead the people against him and that it did not have to be this way. When Gryphus begs for Zeus not to let him die like this, Zeus changes Gryphus back to mortal form as a mist covers over Gryphus' dead body. As Zeus declares that Gryphus is now "free," Hercules helps Iolaus and the other people being held by the Minotaur and the two brothers are reunited. With the people of the village now safe and Iolaus freed, the two men journey back home.

Cast
 Kevin Sorbo as Hercules
 Anthony Quinn as Zeus
 Michael Hurst as Iolaus
 Tawny Kitaen as Deianira
 Anthony Ray Parker as Gryphus (Minotaur)
 Al Chalk as Gryphus (voice)
 Rose McIver as Ilea
 Paul McIver as Aeson
 Simon Lewthwaite as Klonus

External links
 

1994 television films
1994 films
Hercules: The Legendary Journeys
Films set in ancient Greece
Films about Heracles
Films directed by Josh Becker
New Zealand television films
Minotaur